Marian Culineac (born 1 January 1952) is a Romanian boxer. He competed in the men's light heavyweight event at the 1972 Summer Olympics.

References

1952 births
Living people
Romanian male boxers
Olympic boxers of Romania
Boxers at the 1972 Summer Olympics
Sportspeople from Bucharest
Light-heavyweight boxers